Rachael Anne Eubanks is the 47th Michigan State Treasurer.

Before being state treasurer, Eubanks was appointed by Governor Rick Snyder to serve on the Michigan Public Service Commission as a utility regulatory commissioner in 2016, and was reappointed in 2017. She stepped down from this position when she was appointed as state treasurer by Governor Gretchen Whitmer in 2019. Eubanks currently serves on the National Association of State Treasurers.

Eubanks lives in East Lansing.

References

1981 births
20th-century African-American people
20th-century African-American women
21st-century African-American politicians
21st-century African-American women
21st-century American politicians
21st-century American women politicians
African-American women in politics
Living people
State treasurers of Michigan
University of Michigan alumni
People from East Lansing, Michigan
Women state constitutional officers of Michigan